The Trondhjem Hospital (colloquially: Hospitalet) is a charitable foundation in Trondheim, Norway.

The Hospital runs a nursing home, a home for demented persons, apartments for assisted living, and retirement apartments with attached home service. Its several buildings in Trondheim include the Hospital Church (Hospitalskirken).

Created in 1277 by Archbishop Jon Raude, the Hospital is one of Norway's oldest foundations.

References

External links 
 Official site 

Foundations based in Norway
1277 establishments in Europe
13th-century establishments in Norway
Organisations based in Trondheim